Mount Bradshaw is a mountain peak,  high, at the northeast side of the névé of Leap Year Glacier,  northwest of Ian Peak, in the Bowers Mountains, a major mountain range situated within Victoria Land, Antarctica. The topographical feature was so named by the New Zealand Antarctic Place-Names Committee in 1983 after J.D. Bradshaw, a geologist at the University of Canterbury, New Zealand, who was a member of the New Zealand Antarctic Research Program geological parties to the area, 1974–75 and 1981–82. The mountain lies situated on the Pennell Coast, a portion of Antarctica lying between Cape Williams and Cape Adare.

References 

Mountains of Victoria Land
Pennell Coast